Yes, Madam is a 1933 British comedy film directed by Leslie S. Hiscott and starring Frank Pettingell, Kay Hammond and Harold French. It was a quota quickie made at Beaconsfield Studios.

Cast
 Frank Pettingell as Albert Peabody  
 Kay Hammond as Pansy Beresford  
 Harold French as Bill Quinton  
 Muriel Aked as Mrs. Peabody  
 Hugh Tolliver as Peter Haddon  
 Wyn Weaver as Mr. Mountain  
 Hal Walters as Catlett

References

Bibliography
 Low, Rachael. Filmmaking in 1930s Britain. George Allen & Unwin, 1985.
 Wood, Linda. British Films, 1927-1939. British Film Institute, 1986.

External links

1933 films
British comedy films
1933 comedy films
1930s English-language films
Films shot at Beaconsfield Studios
Films directed by Leslie S. Hiscott
Quota quickies
British black-and-white films
1930s British films